Helsinki Thunder  was a temporary street circuit located in Helsinki, Finland. The circuit was conceived by former racing driver Robert Lappalainen. From 1995 to 1997, it hosted events in the FIA GT Championship, Deutsche Tourenwagen Meisterschaft and International Formula 3000 Championship.

Lap records 

The official race lap records at the Helsinki Thunder are listed as:

References

External links
Track information

Buildings and structures in Helsinki
Defunct motorsport venues in Finland